Vello Lään (9 June 1937 – 12 June 2022) was an Estonian sport journalist, writer and radio broadcaster.

Career
In 1960 he graduated from University of Tartu.

1960–1975 he was an editor at the newspaper Põllumajanduse Akadeemia. 1975–1991 he was the head of Estonian Radio's Tartu studio. 1991–2000 he was principal director of Tartu Radio.

Awards:
 1999: Kuldmikrofon ('Golden Microphone') 
 2001: Order of the White Star, V class.

Publications

 "Korvpall". Eesti Korvpalliliit, 2002. ISBN 9985-78-830-3
 "38 suvise olümpiaala reeglid". Eesti Entsüklopeediakirjastus, 2004. ISBN 9985-70-161-5
 "Helsingist Helsingis – kergejõustiku maailmameistrivõistlused 1983-2005" [one of the authors]. Eesti Päevalehe Kirjastus, 2005. ISBN 9985-9565-8-3
 "Olümpiamängud. 15 talvise olümpiaala reeglid ja 18 muud talvist ala". Eesti Entsüklopeediakirjastus, 2006. ISBN 9985-70-220-4

References

1937 births
2022 deaths
Estonian journalists
Estonian male writers
Estonian non-fiction writers
Estonian radio personalities
Recipients of the Order of the White Star, 5th Class
University of Tartu alumni
People from Tartu
Writers from Tartu
Male non-fiction writers